Tres Isletas is a town in Chaco Province, Argentina. It is the head town of the Maipú Department.

Tres Isletas (meaning 3 little islands) was founded in 1939. The local economy is based on agriculture, beekeeping and food production.

External links

Populated places in Chaco Province
Populated places established in 1937